Voigt Ledge is a flat-topped ridge that rises to  between the head of Greenville Valley and Merrell Valley in the Convoy Range of Victoria Land. It was named by the Advisory Committee on Antarctic Names in 2008 after Donald E. Voigt of the Department of Geosciences and Penn State Ice and Climate Exploration Center, Pennsylvania State University, who carried out research in glaciology, geophysics and seismology in diverse parts of Antarctica, including the Transantarctic Mountains, in 12 field seasons from 1995 to 2008.

References

Ridges of Victoria Land